Oregon Route 47 is an Oregon state highway that runs between the Willamette Valley, near McMinnville, and the city of Clatskanie, along the Columbia River in the northwest part of the state.  OR 47 traverses several highways of the Oregon state highway system: part of the Tualatin Valley Highway No. 29, part of the Nehalem Highway No. 102, part of the Sunset Highway No. 47, and the Mist–Clatskanie Highway No. 110.

Route description

Oregon Route 47 begins (at its southern terminus) at a junction with Oregon Route 99W between the cities of McMinnville and Lafayette. This stretch is known as the Tualatin Valley Highway. It continues north along the western edge of the Willamette Valley, hugging the Coast Range. It passes through parts of Oregon's wine country (and some prime agricultural land), and through small towns such as Carlton, Yamhill, and Gaston. The first large city encountered is Forest Grove. A bypass around the east side of town avoids the downtown area.

In Forest Grove, OR 47 intersects Oregon Route 8, and the Tualatin Valley Highway leaves Oregon Route 47, and continues east towards Hillsboro and Beaverton on Oregon Route 8. North of the intersection, OR 47 is known as the Nehalem Highway. It continues north, passing through the town of Banks. North of Banks, OR 47 shares an alignment for about 4 miles (6 km) with U.S. Route 26 over the Sunset Highway, which is—a bit confusingly—Highway 47. North of Manning, OR 47 and US 26 part ways. OR 47 continues north, following the North Fork of Dairy Creek to its source and passing L.L. "Stub" Stewart Memorial State Park and shortly thereafter reaching the summit called "Tophill" where the highway departs the Willamette River drainage and enters the Nehalem drainage. From Tophill, the highway quickly winds down to a tributary of the Nehalem River and finds the Nehalem River at the extinct community of Treharne.

Though in the mountainous Northern Oregon Coast Range, the Nehalem Highway itself is just winding, as it follows the banks of the Nehalem River all the way to Jewell, passing through Vernonia and Pittsburg. However, Pittsburg is little more than a road junction where the Scappoose-Vernonia Road breaks off and heads up the East Fork of the Nehalem River for Scappoose, Oregon. A few miles further north, Route 47 reaches the Apiary junction with destinations for Apiary and Rainier. The Apiary road is popular with truckers as it does not have the restrictive length limitations which are applied to OR 47 North of Mist or Oregon Route 202 west of Jewell because of numerous short turns.

This stretch of OR 47 is rather mountainous, with many sharp turns and steep grades. Eventually, OR 47 descends out of the mountains into the Columbia River basin, and ends in the city of Clatskanie at an intersection with U.S. Route 30.

Major intersections

References

047
Transportation in Washington County, Oregon
Transportation in Yamhill County, Oregon
Transportation in Columbia County, Oregon
Forest Grove, Oregon
Banks, Oregon